Chris Givens (born December 6, 1989) is a former American football wide receiver. He was selected in the fourth round, 96th overall by the St. Louis Rams in the 2012 NFL Draft. He played college football at Wake Forest.

High school career
Givens attended Wylie High School in Wylie, Texas, where he was a two-sport star in football and track. He suffered a torn ACL in his left knee in September 2007 to bring an early close to his high school football career. Rushed for 247 yards and four touchdowns on 30 carries against Hebron in the second game of the 2007 season, but injured his knee the following week in the first quarter against Richardson Berkner.

Givens was regarded as a two-star recruit by Rivals.com, and was a teammate of Patrick Witt.

Also an outstanding track & field athlete, Givens won the District 9-5A 100 meter title in 2007. He was third in the district meet in 2007 in the 200-meter dash with a 22.29 clocking and a member of the district champion 800 meter relay team (1:28.33). He ran a 10.44-second 100-meter dash (electronic) at the Jesuit-Sheaner Relays in 2007. In late January 2008, just 15 weeks after ACL surgery, he clocked a 10.70 in the 100 meters. Also ran a 10.03 100m during the 2008 Region 2-5A meet. He was ranked as high as the fourth fastest in the 100 meters in the Texas high school ranks.

College career
Givens played college football at Wake Forest University from 2009 to 2011.  He totaled 629 receiving yards as a redshirt freshman in 2009 and 514 as a redshirt sophomore in 2010.   In July 2011, he was placed on the watchlist for the Fred Biletnikoff Award.  After catching six passes for 101 yards in Wake Forest's October 2011 win over Florida State, Givens was named the Offensive Receiver of the Week by the Atlantic Coast Conference for the second consecutive week.  In the first seven games of the 2011 season, Givens had 46 receptions for 866 yards and eight touchdowns.  As of October 23, 2011, Givens's 886 receiving yards during the 2011 season ranked fifth among NCAA Division I FBS players.

Statistics

Professional career

2012 NFL Draft

Givens was selected by the St. Louis Rams in the fourth round (96th overall) in the 2012 NFL Draft. Givens was the first player selected on Day 3 of the 2012 Draft.

St. Louis Rams

2012 season
On June 1, 2012, Givens signed a four-year contract with the Rams worth $2.6 million. Through the first two games of the regular season, he was held without a reception or a target from the quarterback. Givens would not catch a pass until Week 3 against the Seattle Seahawks, when he beat Seahawks cornerback Richard Sherman for a 52-yard reception.

In a Week 5 win against the Arizona Cardinals, Givens caught a 51-yard pass, resulting in the first touchdown of his NFL career. He would go on to catch a pass of 50-plus yards in five consecutive games from September 30 to October 21, 2012, an NFL rookie record for most consecutive games with a 50-plus yard reception. The receptions came against the Seattle Seahawks,  Arizona Cardinals, Miami Dolphins, Green Bay Packers, and New England Patriots. During Week 10 of the regular season, Givens was suspended along with fellow rookie Janoris Jenkins for reportedly violating teams rules. Both players were sidelined and the specifics about their suspensions were never revealed. In Week 12 against the Arizona Cardinals, Givens logged his first 100-plus yard receiving game of his career.

Givens ended his rookie campaign with 42 catches for 698 yards and 3 touchdowns, leading all Rams receivers in receiving yards.

2013 season
Despite high expectations heading into the 2013 season, inconsistency at quarterback and poor play by Givens himself resulted in him having a down season. He finished the year with 34 receptions for 569 yards and no touchdowns.

Baltimore Ravens

2015 season
On October 3, 2015, Givens was traded to the Baltimore Ravens for a 2017 seventh round draft pick. In a Week 10 game versus the Jacksonville Jaguars, Givens caught a 14-yard touchdown pass for his only score of the season, finishing the game with four catches and 37 receiving yards, but the Ravens lost the game 22–20. Givens would finish the season with 20 receptions for 353 yards and was cut by Baltimore during the offseason.

Philadelphia Eagles
Givens signed a one-year deal with the Philadelphia Eagles on March 16, 2016. Before the start of the 2016 season, he was released by the team on August 28.

Career statistics

Memphis Express
In 2018, Givens signed with the Memphis Express of the Alliance of American Football for the 2019 season. He did not make the final roster.

References

External links
 
 Wake Forest Demon Deacons bio
 St. Louis Rams bio

1989 births
Living people
American football wide receivers
Baltimore Ravens players
Memphis Express (American football) players
People from Wylie, Texas
Philadelphia Eagles players
Players of American football from Texas
Sportspeople from the Dallas–Fort Worth metroplex
St. Louis Rams players
Wake Forest Demon Deacons football players